A tape measure or measuring tape is a flexible ruler used to measure length or distance.

It consists of a ribbon of cloth, plastic, fibre glass, or metal strip with linear measurement markings. It is a common measuring tool. Its design allows for a measure of great length to be easily carried in pocket or toolkit and permits one to measure around curves or corners. Today it is ubiquitous, even appearing in miniature form as a keychain fob, or novelty item. Surveyors use tape measures in lengths of over 100 m.

Types 
There are two basic types of tape measures with cases: spring return pocket tape measures and long tape measures. Spring return pocket tape measures will generally fit in a pocket. They are small; the case is up to about three inches across. The tape is returned to the case by a spring mechanism.

A second tape measure design is what is called the long tape.  These are cased tape measures with tapes of 25, 50, 75, 100, 200, 300, and even 500 feet in length, designed for engineers and builders. Because surveying was usually done in rods, surveyors use long tapes of 33 feet (2 rods), and 66 feet (4 rods).  Surveyors also used  feet of a 50-foot tape for 3 rods and 99 feet of a 100-foot tape measure for 6 rods.  Long tapes, instead of being returned by a spring, were usually returned by hand crank.
 
Tape measures are often designed for specific uses or trades. Tapes may have different scales, be made of different materials, and be of different lengths depending on the intended use.  Tape measures that were intended for use in tailoring or dressmaking were made from flexible cloth or plastic. They are named "sewing tape". These types of tape measures were mainly used for the measuring of the subject's waist line. Today, measuring tapes made for sewing are made of fiberglass, which does not tear or stretch as easily.  Measuring tapes designed for carpentry or construction often use a stiff, curved metallic ribbon that can remain stiff and straight when extended, but retracts into a coil for convenient storage. This type of tape measure will have a floating tang or hook on the end to aid measuring. The tang is connected to the tape with loose rivets through oval holes, and can move a distance equal to its thickness, to provide both inside and outside measurements that are accurate. A tape measure of 25 or even 100 feet can wind into a relatively small container. The self-marking tape measure allows the user an accurate one hand measure.

History 
The first record of people using a measuring device was by the Romans using marked strips of leather, but this was more like a regular ruler than a tape measure.

On 6 December 1864 patent #45,372 was issued to William H. Bangs of West Meriden, Connecticut. Bang's rule was the first attempt in the United States to make a spring return pocket tape measure. The tape could be stopped at any point and held by the mechanism.  The tape could be returned to the case by sliding a button on the side of the case which then allowed the spring to pull the tape back into the case.

The first patented long tape measure in the United States was granted U.S. patent #29,096 issued 10 July 1860 to William H. Paine of Sheboygan, Wisconsin, and produced by George M. Eddy and Company of Brooklyn, New York.  This tape had no increments on it.  It accurately measured only a distance equal to the total length of the tape from beginning to end marker, a brass piece attached to the tape at a measured distance.  The measured length was marked on the case or crank.

Later, by the early 1870s, Justus Roe of Patchogue, New York added rivets attaching small brass washers to the tape to mark inches and feet.  They were attached every inch in the first and last foot and every foot from one to the end of the last foot.  A small brass tag, marked with a number indicating the number of feet to that point, was attached every five feet.  This feature was never patented, but Justus Roe and Sons produced tape measures, "Roe Electric Reel Tape Measures", with this feature during the 1890s and early 1900s when they started etching or stamping increments and numbers on the tapes.  (The "electric" part of the name was purely an affectation; there was nothing electrical about it.)

On 3 January 1922, Hiram A. Farrand received patent #1,402,589 for his concave-convex tape, a major improvement for spring pocket tape measures. Between 1922 and December 1926, Farrand experimented with the help of The Brown Company in Berlin, New Hampshire. It is there Farrand and William Wentworth Brown began mass-producing the tape measure. Their product was later sold to Stanley Works.  It was Farrand's concave-convex tape that went on to become the standard for the majority of pocket tape measure tapes today.

In the 1900's certain manufacturers started selling novelty tape measurers with prophecies and fortunes instead of numbers: users could check friends' heights and receive a fortune instead of their number.

In 1947, the Swedish engineer  Ture Anders Ljungberg began developing an improved version and in 1954 the TALmeter was introduced. It features edges at both the end of the tape and the mouth to cut marks so measures (including arcs)  can be transferred without reading the scale, as well as a fold-out metal tongue at the rear, also with an edge, to be used when taking internal measures. The tape has three scales: the normal metric, the internal scale and a diameter scale used for instance to measure sheet metal to be rolled into a cylinder of a certain diameter. It was produced by his own company T A Ljungberg AB until 2005, when it was bought by Hultafors in 2005, who retained the name "Talmeter" for the product they now refer to as a märkmeter (marker-meter). 

In March 1963, Stanley Tools introduced the PowerLock tape measure series which defined the standard for tape measure form factors thats still persists today.  It was novel in its use of a molded ABS case, thumb actuated tape lock, and riveted end hook. By 1989, Stanley was producing more than 200,000 tape measures every day.

The first commercialized Digital Tape Measure was released by Starrett in 1995 under the DigiTape brand.  In March 2022, REEKON Tools announced the T1 Tomahawk Digital Tape Measure which featured significant accuracy improvements over previous attempts.

Design
The basic design on which all modern spring tape measures are built can trace its origins back to an 1864 patent by a Meriden, Connecticut resident named William H. Bangs Jr. According to the text of his patent, Bang's tape measure was an improvement on other versions previously designed.

The spring tape measure has existed in the U.S. since Bang's patent in 1864, but its usage did not become very popular due to the difficulty in communication from one town to another and the expense of the tape measure. In the late 1920s, carpenters began slowly adopting H. A. Farrand's design as the one more commonly used.  Farrand's new design was a concave/convex tape made of metal which would stand straight out a distance of four to six feet.  This design is the basis for most modern pocket tape measures used today.

With the mass production of the integrated circuit (IC) the tape measure has also entered into the digital age with the digital tape measure. Some incorporate a digital screen to give measurement readouts in multiple formats. An early patent for this type of measure was published in 1977.

There are also other styles of tape measures that have incorporated lasers and ultrasonic technology to measure the distance of an object with fairly reliable accuracy.

Tape measures often have black and red measurements on a yellow background as this is the optimal color combination for readability.

United States

The Northern Virginia Surveyors Association presented the 600-foot, gold-plated surveyor's tape measure to Mickey Mantle in 1956.

Some tapes sold in the United States have additional marks in the shape of small black diamonds, which appear every . These are used to mark out equal spacing for joists (five joists or trusses per US standard  length of building material).

Many US tapes also have special markings every , which is a US standard interval for studs in construction. Three spaces of 16 inches make exactly  which is the US commercial width of a sheet of plywood, gyprock or particle board.
 

The sale of dual Metric/US Customary scale measuring tapes is slowly becoming common in the United States. For example, in some Walmarts there are Hyper Tough brand tapes available in both US customary units and Metric units. Unlike US rules, of which an overwhelming majority contain both centimeter and inch scales, tape measures are longer and thus traditionally have had scales in both inches and feet & inches. So, the inclusion of a metric scale requires the measuring device either to contain 3 scales of measurement or the elimination of one of the US Customary scales.

The use of millimeter only tape measures for housing construction is a part of the US metric building code. This code does not permit the use of centimeters. Millimeters produce whole (integer) numbers, reduce arithmetic errors, thus decreasing wastage due to such errors. The US made measuring tape shown on the right is interesting in that it is a "Reverse Measuring Tape", where the measurements can be read from right to left just as well as they can be read when the tape is used from left to right.

Australia, Bangladesh, Botswana, Cameroon, India, Kenya, Mauritius, New Zealand, Pakistan, South Africa, United Kingdom, and Zimbabwe all use millimeters only as their unit for building construction. In accord with ISO 2848, the separation between studs is 600 millimeters which has 24 different divisors easing calculation. The metric roll-up tape shown is a millimeter only tape measure. The dual scale tape measure is in both US Customary Inches and Centimeters.

Australia 
The building industry was the first major industry grouping in Australia to complete its change to metric, being completed by January 1976.

In this the industry was grateful to the SAA (now Standards Australia) for the early production of the Standard AS 1155-1974 "Metric Units for Use in the Construction Industry", which specified the use of millimetres as the small unit for the metrication upgrade.
In the adoption of the millimetre as the "small" unit of length for metrication (instead of the centimetre) the Metric Conversion Board leaned heavily on experience in the UK and within the ISO, where this decision had already been taken.

This was formally stated as follows:
"The metric units for linear measurement in building and construction will be the metre (m) and the millimetre (mm), with the kilometre (km) being used where required. This will apply to all sectors of the industry, and the centimetre (cm) shall not be used. … the centimetre should not be used in any calculation and it should never be written down".

The logic of using the millimetre in this context was that the metric system had been so designed that there would exist a multiple or submultiple for every use. Decimal fractions would not have to be used. Since the tolerances on building components and building practice would rarely be less than one millimetre, the millimetre became the sub-unit most appropriate to this industry.

Because of this, those in the building/construction industry mainly use millimetre only tapes. 
While dual scale tapes showing both inches and centimetres are sold, these are mainly imported low-cost items (since it would be a restriction of trade to not allow their importation).

United Kingdom
Tape measures sold in the UK often have dual scales for metric and imperial units.

Canada 
Tape measures sold in Canada often have dual scales for metric and imperial units. All tapes in imperial units have markings every , but not at every .
Home construction in Canada is largely, if not entirely, in imperial measure.

In surveying
Tapes are used in surveying for measuring horizontal, vertical or slope distances. Tapes are issued in various lengths and widths and graduated in a variety of ways.
The measuring tapes used for surveying purposes are classified in 4 types according to the material from which they are manufactured:
 Linen or Cloth Tape is made of linen cloth with brass handle at zero end whose length is included in the tape length. It is very light and handy, but cannot withstand much wear and tear. So it cannot be used for accurate work. It is little used in surveying except for taking subsidiary measurements like offsets. 
 Metallic Tape is reinforced with copper wires to prevent stretching or twisting of fibers. They are available in many lengths but tapes of 20 m and 30 m are more commonly used. 
 Steel Tape is made of steel ribbon varying in width from 6 mm to 16 mm. It is available in lengths of 1, 2, 10, 30 and 50 meters. It cannot withstand rough usage and should therefore be used with great care. 
 Invar Tape is made of invar, an alloy of steel (64%) and nickel (36%). It is 6 mm wide and is available in lengths of 30 m, 50 m and 100 m. It is costly and delicate and should be thus handled with great care.

Accuracy and standardisation 

The accuracy of a tape measure is dependent on the ends of the tape and the markings printed onto the tape. The accuracy for the end of a retractable tape measure is dependent on the hook's sliding mechanism and thickness.

The European Commission (EC) has standardised a non-compulsory classification system for certifying tape measure accuracy, with certified tapes falling into one of three classes of accuracy: Classes I, II, and III. For example, under specific conditions the tolerances for 10m long tapes are:

 Class I: accurate to ±1.10mm over 10m length
 Class II: accurate to ±2.30mm over 10m length
 Class III: accurate to ±4.60mm over 10m length

If a tape measure has been certified then the class rating is printed onto the tape alongside other symbols including the nominal length of the tape, the year of manufacture, the country of manufacture, and the name of the manufacturer. For retractable tapes, Class I are the most accurate and tend to be the most expensive, while Class II tapes are the most common class available.

References

External links

 Various types of measuring tapes and construction materials
 Various types of measuring tapes
 Commercial Types of measuring tapes
 

Length, distance, or range measuring devices
Metalworking measuring instruments
Woodworking measuring instruments
Sewing equipment
Surveying instruments